Sierakowice is a non-operational PKP railway station in Sierakowice (Pomeranian Voivodeship), Poland.

The line of the railway can still be seen between Piwna and Skarpowa streets.

Lines crossing the station

References 
Sierakowice article at Polish stations database, URL accessed at 18 March 2006

Railway stations in Pomeranian Voivodeship
Disused railway stations in Pomeranian Voivodeship
Kartuzy County